Cho Man Kit v Broadcasting Authority was a Hong Kong High Court case that involved a challenge of a decision by the Broadcasting Authority that ruled a television documentary as offensive and partial in its treatment of same-sex marriage. The Court ruled that the decision was unlawful.

Background
In July 2006, RTHK broadcast a documentary during family viewing hours named Gay Lovers. The documentary captured the lives of gay people and their difficulties, thoughts, and feelings in interviews with a lesbian couple and a gay man, Cho Man Kit, who was the applicant of the case. In the programme, the interviewees said they hoped that Hong Kong government would recognise same-sex marriage or civil union. The Broadcasting Authority then received complaints about the programme. In January 2007, after its Complaints Committee's investigation, the Broadcasting Authority handed down and published an admonition criticising that the programme did not fulfil the codes of practice issued by the Authority. In particular, the Broadcasting Authority believed that the programme was biased in a way of advocating homosexuality and same-sex marriage and should not have been shown during family viewing hours when the programme involved sensitive issues.

Later, different organisations, including Hong Kong Journalists Association, expressed great concern of the impact of the ruling on future editorial deliberations. The Information, Technology and Broadcasting Panel of the Legislative Council also passed a motion hoping that the Broadcasting Authority could revisit the admonition because the ruling created discrimination based on sexual orientation. However, on 23 March 2007, the Broadcasting Authority stated that the ruling was ‘functus’ and thus unable to revisit it.  The applicant of the case then applied for judicial review. Judge Hartmann of the High Court heard the oral argument from the parties in February 2008. Three months later, the Court issued certiorari and struck down the admonition because of its discriminatory nature and the resulted unjustified interference on freedom of speech.
On 4 July 2008, the Broadcasting Authority announced that it would not appeal.

The Admonition
In the proceeding, the Broadcasting Authority argued that the issued admonition was based on two permissible findings: (1) nonconformity with impartiality standard and (2) inappropriate broadcasting time for children. The reasoning of its ruling were cited and reviewed in the court proceeding:

Reviewed Reasoning 1:

Reviewed Reasoning 2:

Reviewed Reasoning 3:

(judgment, paragraphs 32, 78, 88 & 93)

Codes of Practice & Related Law
According to the Broadcasting Ordinance and the Broadcasting Authority Ordinance, the Broadcasting Authority was legally obligated to establish and enforce the Codes of Practice which monitored that all licensees and their programmes would be in conformity with ‘proper standards’. The following are the scripts of the Codes of Practice regarding impartiality and broadcasting schedule discussed in the court proceeding. (judgment, paragraphs 14 & 15)

Court’s Analysis
Before giving his final judgment, Judge Hartmann went through a series of analysis with three focuses:
 Nonconformity with Impartiality Standards
 Inappropriate Broadcasting Time for Children
 Refusal to Revisit the Admonition

Analysis Focus A: Nonconformity with Impartiality Standards

What would be the standards of impartiality?
The Court recognised the fact that it would be for the Authority to determine what the statutory requirement of ‘proper standards’ of broadcasting and how it would codify the ‘proper standards’ concept. Still, the Court simply saw the Authority would and must take account of public opinion of reasonable Hong Kongers in the drafting process of the Codes or in the examination of complaints about any particular programmes. Judge Hartmann believed and further explained that those who were reasonable must understand that any consensus based on prejudices, personal aversions and dubious rationalisation could never justify any infringements of fundamental rights and freedoms, including free speech. It was accepted by the judge that there was no problem to require impartiality in broadcasting; moreover, he considered that the concept of impartiality not only meant that being balance and those definitions contained in Chapter 9 of the Codes but also meant being unbiased, unprejudiced, and fair. (judgment, paragraphs 72-76)

Did the programme violate the standards of impartiality?
After reviewing the reasoning of the admonition, the Court discovered that the Authority's central concern of the nonconformity of impartiality was related to the topic of same-sex marriage raised by the participants appeared in the documentary. The Court believed that the only way for the programme to be impartial in the Authority's sense would be for RTHK to insert someone's views that homosexual marriages should not be desired. The rationale for the Court to have such impression was that the Authority criticised RTHK that the lack of different opinions on same-sex marriage had amounted to the same effect of advocating same-sex marriage in Hong Kong.

It was a fact that the programme was indeed lack of opposite views on same-sex marriage, but the Court did not see this insufficiency could have resulted in advocating same-sex marriage. Since the programme was a study of human condition, the Court simply accepted that it would be absolutely natural to record what would be important to homosexuals, including their hopes in legalising same-sex marriage. The Court equated this as normal as if ‘hunter-gatherers may express the hope that their lands will not be further encroached upon by farmers.’ Thus, the Court ruled the programme was indeed ‘impartial’. Then, Judge Hartmann concluded that the only answer for the Authority had come into the ruling of the programme's failure to be impartial for only one reason: the subject matter of the documentary was homosexuality. The judge criticised and humiliated the Authority by asking the question whether or not a similar ruling would have been reached if the programme had focused on hunter-gatherers. (judgment, paragraphs 78-85)

Was the admonition discriminatory, and thus, imposing unjustified restrictions on free speech?
Referring back to the Authority's reasoning of the admonition(see above Reviewed Reasoning 2), the Court found out that the Authority had simply believed that homosexuality itself would be enough to offend certain viewers of the programme. Subsequently, the Authority was found that it had imposed unjustified restrictions on freedom of speech based on such belief. It was clear to the Court that such belief had been founded upon ‘a supposed consensus among certain people based on “prejudices, personal aversions and dubious rationalisations”.’ In his attempt to define the phrase ‘prejudices, personal aversions and dubious rationalisations’, Judge Hartmann quoted a passage of Professor Dworkin’ work which had also been cited by the Court of Appeal in Secretary for Justice v. Yau Yuk Lung Zigo:

(judgment, paragraphs 66, 86-92)

Analysis Focus B: Inappropriate Broadcasting Time for Children

What would be the criteria of the suitability of programme broadcasting time for children?

The Court had no doubt that the Authority was allowed and obligated to establish guidance to regulate programmes broadcasting time for protecting young viewers. Therefore, the related regulations of broadcasting time within the Codes were accepted by the Court, particularly, Section 1 and 3 of Chapter 2 and Section 1 of Chapter 7 of the Codes.
(judgment, paragraphs 93-98)

Should the programme have been shown in a later hour?

The Court agreed that the programme involved homosexual issues which fell under the definition of ‘sex’ contained in Section 3 of Chapter 2 of the Codes; consequently, it would enable the Authority to recommend the programme be shown after Family Viewing Hours (4pm to 8:30pm). 
(judgment, paragraphs 104-108)

Analysis Focus C: Refusal to Revisit the Admonition

Could the Authority go back and revisit the admonition?

The Authority explained to the Court that the admonition was ‘functus' because an effective memorandum corresponding to relevant statues limiting its powers did not provide a way for the Authority to reconsider the admonition or a way for RTHK to appeal against the admonition. However, the Court discovered that the memorandum had been based on consensus only and materially different in a lot of areas from the relevant statues. As a result, the Court ruled that the lack of appeal routes against the admonition could not operate under procedural laws. 
(judgment, paragraphs 111-115)

Holding
After a thorough analysis, the High Court gave the following orders:
An order of certiorari to bring up and quash the admonition because of its homosexual discriminatory nature and the consequent unjustified restrictions on freedom of speech.
An order of declaration which stated that the Authority had had no power to reconsider its determination was wrong; and in fact, the Authority did have power to reconsider or amend its determination.
(judgment, paragraph 116)

See also

 Leung TC William Roy v Secretary for Justice
 Secretary for Justice v Yau Yuk Lung Zigo

References
Youtube Video 'Gay Lovers' Part 1 with English subtitle
Youtube Video 'Gay Lovers' Part 2 with English subtitle
Youtube Video 'Gay Lovers' Part 3 Chinese only
Broadcasting Authority website
Codes of Practice (Programme Standards)
Broadcasting Ordinance
Broadcasting Authority Ordinance
Hong Kong Bill of Rights Ordinance
The Basic Law
Press Release Related to the Admonition
High Court judgment

LGBT rights case law
Hong Kong case law
LGBT rights in Hong Kong